Parsa Singh is an Indian athlete. He won a silver medal in Javelin throw in the 1951 Asian Games.

References

Asian Games medalists in athletics (track and field)
Athletes (track and field) at the 1951 Asian Games
Asian Games silver medalists for India
Medalists at the 1951 Asian Games
Possibly living people
Year of birth missing
Indian male javelin throwers